Clive Nattress (born 24 May 1951) is an English former footballer who made 340 appearances in the Football League playing as a defender for Darlington and Halifax Town in the 1970s and 1980s. He also played for Consett, Blackpool (though not for the first team), Bishop Auckland, Crook Town (as player-manager) and Ferryhill Athletic. While still a Darlington player, he took part as a guest in Crook Town's pioneering tour to India in 1976.

Nattress was born in Durham. He is a cousin of the newsreader Angela Rippon.

References

1951 births
Living people
Sportspeople from Durham, England
Footballers from County Durham
English footballers
Association football defenders
Consett A.F.C. players
Blackpool F.C. players
Darlington F.C. players
Halifax Town A.F.C. players
Bishop Auckland F.C. players
Crook Town A.F.C. players
Ferryhill Athletic F.C. players
English Football League players
Northern Football League players
Association football player-managers